The  is a Japanese luxury sedan that manufactured and marketed by Nissan from 1965 until 2010 as a JDM luxury sedan, the flagship of Nissan's range, marketed at its Nissan Motor Store dealerships. 

Initially marketed in the JDM, in the late 1980s, exports began to a few countries including Singapore and Hong Kong, though sales were limited. When the President was introduced in 1965, it was marketed under the "Nissan" badge, unlike other Nissan products at the time, which were marketed under the  Datsun brand.



First generation (150; 1965) 

The first generation of the Nissan President, designated H150, was introduced in October 1965, replacing the Cedric Special as Nissan's top-of-the-range model, and was exclusive to Japanese Nissan dealerships called Nissan Motor Store. Ownership costs of the fully hand-built President were elevated due to its external dimensions and engine displacement placing it in the top road tax bracket. The President appeared after the Toyota Crown Eight debuted in 1963, and was developed by Nissan as a possible submission for a limousine to be used by the Imperial Household Agency of Japan.

Its appearance is very similar to the smaller but more popular Nissan Bluebird introduced earlier in 1964. Like the Bluebird, the President was built at Nissan's Oppama plant in Yokosuka, Kanagawa. A small number (fewer than 200) of left-hand drive models were also built, available for export but mainly sold to Japan's foreign missions and to Japanese companies abroad. These were designated HL150.

From the outside, the V8 is easiest identified by its twin exhaust, whereas the six only has a pipe on the left side. Very lavishly appointed for its time, the President served as the official car of the Japanese Prime Minister Eisaku Satō, while the Emperor of Japan was transported in one of four Nissan Prince Royals developed by Prince Motor Company. Each President was individually tested and fully run in before delivery.

In 1971 Nissan offered EAL (Electro Anti-lock System) as an option on the Nissan President, this became Japan's first electronic ABS (Anti-lock braking system). There were a few trim levels, but most were sold as the fully-loaded Spec-D that featured the "Full Power Equipment" specification with power seats, power windows, twin A/C units, central door locks, plenty of interior lights and remote-controlled auto-tuning radio, among other features. The Spec-C was similar to the Spec-D, but without the power features. Spec-B was powered by the  H30 engine carried over from the Cedric Special 50. The base Spec-A was also powered by the H30, but had a 3-speed column-shift manual, the only version with a manual transmission as Spec-B, C and D had an automatic transmission. Few changes were made to the 150 series, but in October 1971 the outside mirrors were moved closer to the front of the car, the location of the windshield wipers were changed to increase the amount of glass they swept, and the automatic transmission was changed from Borg-Warner to Nissan. This change was announced by the installation of a badge reading "Nissan Matic" at the rear, instead of the earlier "BW Automatic". The Spec-C trim level was dropped after 1971; all V8 models were now only available in Spec-D.

Second generation (250; 1973) 

The second generation, designated 250 (H250 for the V8 versions), was introduced in August 1973. It received a thorough facelift inside and out, while the chassis was essentially the same. The Y40 engine was replaced by the new 4.4-liter Y44. The H30 six-cylinder remained available until 1974 or 1975. The original lineup consisted of two six-cylinder models, type A (three-speed manual) and type B (automatic) and one eight-cylinder model called the type D (automatic only). The car only came with a column-mounted shifter, while the front seats were either separate or a bench. The rear seats were semi-separate and intended to seat two occupants in comfort. The D-type had standard power front seats and also power adjustable rear seat. The President was a very expensive car in Japan - the annual car taxes for the V8 were ¥54,000 in 1973; the average annual salary for a recent university graduate were ¥57,000 at this time.

In April 1975, all trim levels except the type D were dropped, which meant the H30 engine and manual transmission were dropped as well; all Presidents would have V8 engines and automatic transmissions going forward. At the same time, the V8 engine received electronic fuel injection, becoming the Y44E and allowing the car to meet new, stricter emissions standards. The V8 emblem on the bootlid was changed to one that reads "V8E". The chassis code was changed to A-H250. The type D was available in nine different sub-models listed as D-1 through D-9. The top versions had power everything, satin weave nylon seats, an early form of anti-lock brakes, and automatic climate control. This model was also the first Nissan to be equipped with a digital clock.

In July 1976 the engine was modified to meet the 1976 emissions regulations and the model code changed to C-H251. The luxurious Sovereign trim was added in August 1977, when the emissions were again updated to meet the 1978 requirements. This iteration received the E-H252 model code and a redesigned grille. The type C trim level also returned in 1978. In March 1980 the stereo was updated to a AM/FM cassette unit, and a slave clock was added.

In November 1982 the President was updated with suspension improvements, a larger fuel tank, a new instrument cluster and dashboard, a new grille, and the replacement of the round headlights with square halogen versions while maintaining the general exterior and interior appearance. After minor detail improvements and stereo alterations in June (after which bias-ply tires were no longer available) and December 1984, the Sovereign VIP trim (with air sprung rear seat and other additional comforts) was added in January 1985. In March 1986 the Nissan emblems were altered and the rear headrests became adjustable.

Minor changes followed in November 1988, when the types C and D received the same wheel covers as the Sovereign, and in March 1989 when a shift lock was added. Production of the 250 series continued until October 1990, with a total of 33,128 units having been registered in Japan. Power output had been listed in gross horsepower until January 1990, when the President was brought in line with the rest of the industry. The claimed power figure dropped from  net, but actual output and performance were unchanged.

Third generation (HG50; 1990) 

In October 1989 the third-generation President, designated JHG50, debuted at the Tokyo Motor Show, with sales beginning a year later. Concurrently, a short-wheelbase version of the chassis debuted in the United States as Infiniti Q45 or Nissan Infiniti Q45 in Japan, with a different front and rear end — in response to the 1989 Lexus LS and the 1985 Acura Legend. Renewed emphasis sought to position the President as a top-level luxury limousine, with high levels of standard equipment, including Connolly Leather or wool and silk upholstery. This time the vehicle adopted many European styling cues, with its front now resembling the contemporary Jaguar XJ. Unlike the previous, hand-made generations, this was the first President built on an assembly line.

Innovative technological features included a world first feature that debuted in 1993: SRS airbag for the left-hand side (curbside) rear seat passenger. Both the President and the Q45 shared the new 4.5-litre VH45DE V8 engine. In 1993, a short-wheelbase version similar to the Infiniti joined the lineup, badged as President JS. At the same time, Nissan's special vehicles subsidiary Autech developed a Royal Limousine model with split passenger compartment. The Royal was created as a possible replacement for the four 1966 Nissan Prince Royals used by the  Imperial Household Agency for the Coronation Ceremony, or Shukuga Onretsu no Gi of Akihito 12 November 1990, but were not accepted.

In 1994, along with a minor facelift, Nissan revived the Sovereign trim level (previously available for 250 Presidents) for the long-wheelbase model. Another minor facelift occurred in 1998 (designated PHG50). At the same time, the previous Infiniti Q45 was replaced by a model based on a smaller (yet still large) Nissan Cima, which was also fitted with the rear passenger airbag option in Japan. The PHG50 continued in production until 2002 with the arrival of the new F50 chassis.

Fourth generation (PGF50; 2003) 

The third generation was introduced in October 2003, based on the F50 Nissan Cima which had debuted in 2001, being also powered by the same 4.5-litre VK45DE V8 engine. It retained its top position as the flagship limousine at the reorganized Japanese Nissan dealerships called Nissan Blue Stage. Two versions were available, both badged Sovereign, with either five-passenger or four-passenger seating configuration. This model remained Nissan's traditional competitor to the Toyota limousines the Toyota Century and Toyota Celsior, and it competed for customers for three years with the all-new Mitsubishi Dignity as the top level flagship, however Mitsubishi chose to use front wheel drive.

The four-passenger version is considerably more expensive and features lavish equipment, including a Bose sound system and a host of other electronic devices controlled from a panel in the rear central armrest, as well as a "relaxing seat"—a feature allowing the left front passenger seat to be tilted forward, allowing the passenger in the rear to extend the rear seat forward and recline.

Production ending announcement 
In August 2010, Nissan announced that it had stopped the production of both the Nissan Cima and President, which share the same chassis. The two models needed safety upgrades to comply with the latest safety regulations, but lackluster sales showed that the company would not be able to recoup costs. As there was no platform successor to Cima/President, the Nissan Fuga became the flagship for Nissan. Starting in 2012, the Cima name was revived as a stretched Fuga, resuming the market segment formerly held by the President, thereby continuing to offer an alternative to the modern Toyota Crown Majesta premium level limousine made in Japan.

Since its debut in 1965, 56,000 units of the Nissan President have been sold, 63 units were sold in fiscal 2009.

References 

 Nissan President 150 (1966–1968), Pub. No. C-077

External links 

 Nissan President official site  

Flagship vehicles
Full-size vehicles
Limousines
Luxury vehicles
President
Rear-wheel-drive vehicles
Cars introduced in 1965
1970s cars
1980s cars
1990s cars
2000s cars
2010s cars